The 2017–18 season Aris participated in Football League, finished in the second place and were promoted to Super League. The club also competed in the Greek Cup and were eliminated in Group Stage.

First-team squad

Transfers and Loans

Transfers In

Transfers Out

Transfer summary

Spending

Summer:  0 €

Winter:  0 €

Total:  0 €

Income

Summer:  235.000 €

Winter:  0 €

Total:  235.000 €

Net Expenditure

Summer:  235.000 €

Winter:  0 €

Total:  235.000 €

Competitions

Overall

Overview

{| class="wikitable" style="text-align: center"
|-
!rowspan=2|Competition
!colspan=8|Record
|-
!
!
!
!
!
!
!
!
|-
| Football League

|-
| Greek Cup

|-
! Total

Football League

League table

Results summary

Results by matchday

Matches

Greek Cup 

Aris Thessaloniki entered the competition in the Group Stage, as a club from Football League.

Group stage

</noinclude><noinclude>

Matches

Squad statistics

Appearances

Last updated: 27 May 2018
Source: Soccerway

Goals

Last updated: 27 May 2018
Source: Soccerway

Clean sheets 

Last updated: 27 May 2018
Source: Soccerway

References

External links

Aris Thessaloniki F.C. seasons
Greek football clubs 2017–18 season